The CONCACAF Futsal Invitational 2014 is to be hosted by Costa Rica. It is not to be confused with the CONCACAF Futsal Championship, which is staged every four years.

Twelve teams are to take part in the tournament, including Colombia and Iran (appearing as guest nations).

Teams

NAFU
 
 
 

UNCAF
 
 
 
 

CFU
 
 
 

Inviteds

Group stage

Group A

Group B

Group C

References 

CON
2014